The 2022–23 season is the 127th season in the existence of West Ham United Football Club and the club's 11th consecutive season in the top-flight of English football. In addition to the domestic league, they also participated in this season's editions of the FA Cup, the EFL Cup and are participating in the UEFA Europa Conference League.

The season is the first since 2003–04 without Mark Noble, who retired following the 2021–22 campaign. Vice-captain Declan Rice replaced Noble as club captain. Noble returned to West Ham as sporting director on 2 January 2023.

Season summary

Start of season

August

In their first league game on 7 August, West Ham lost 2–0 at home to defending champions, Manchester City, with Erling Haaland scoring his first two competitive goals on his league debut for the club. The match was watched by 62,443 supporters, a record attendance for West Ham and for football at the London Stadium.

In their second league game of the season, West Ham lost 1–0 at the City Ground to newly promoted Nottingham Forest. The game was Forest’s first game in the Premier League for 23 years. Declan Rice had a penalty saved by Dean Henderson while Saïd Benrahma twice hit the woodwork as West Ham again failed to score.

On 18 August, West Ham began their European campaign by playing Danish team Viborg in the first leg of the 2022–23 UEFA Europa Conference League play-off round. Manager David Moyes, captain Declan Rice and defender Aaron Cresswell were all suspended following disciplinary incidents against Eintracht Frankfurt in the previous season’s Europa League semi-final. Two of Viborg’s players, Nigerian winger Ibrahim Said and Gambian forward Alassana Jatta were unavailable as the club was unable to gain entry visas to the UK following new rules applicable to non-EU nationals following Brexit.

The Hammers won their opening Conference League match 3–1. In the game, Gianluca Scamacca scored his first goal for the club, assisted by new signing Maxwel Cornet. Jarrod Bowen doubled their lead before Viborg's Jakob Bonde pulled one back for the Danish club. Substitute Michail Antonio scored a 78th-minute goal to give the Hammers a two goal lead going into the reverse fixture in Denmark.

West Ham returned to the Premier League on 21 August to play Brighton & Hove Albion, with a new record crowd of 62,449. New signing Thilo Kehrer made his league debut in the match, fouling Danny Welbeck in the box and giving away a penalty, which Alexis Mac Allister converted. Brighton scored a second through Leandro Trossard and the game finished 2–0, marking West Ham's third consecutive league defeat and leaving them bottom of the table. This was the first time since 1971 that West Ham had lost their first three games of the season without scoring in the top tier.

West Ham then travelled to Denmark for the second leg of their Conference League play-off against Viborg on 25 August. Gianluca Scamacca opened the scoring in the first half, whilst Saïd Benrahma and Tomáš Souček added to the scoreline in the second. The game finished 3–0, with an aggregate scoreline of 6–1, as West Ham qualified comfortably for the group stage.

On 28 August, the Hammers travelled to Birmingham to play Aston Villa in the Premier League. Pablo Fornals scored West Ham's first league goal of the season in the 74th minute, his shot deflecting off of Ezri Konsa and over goalkeeper Emiliano Martínez, securing West Ham's first league win of the season as the game finished 1–0. The game was West Ham’s 1000th in the Premier League, the ninth club to reach this total.

On 31 August, West Ham played their first London derby of the season, against Tottenham Hotspur. The game finished 1–1 due to an own goal from Thilo Kehrer and a second-half equaliser from Tomáš Souček. West Ham’s record signing, Lucas Paquetá made his debut in the match. The game marked the 200th appearances in all competitions by Declan Rice and in the Premier League by Michail Antonio.

September
On 3 September, West Ham played their second London derby, this time away to Chelsea. Michail Antonio scored in the 62nd minute before the Hammers were pegged back by a Ben Chilwell equaliser just fourteen minutes later. Kai Havertz scored the winning goal in the 88th minute, however, a last-minute West Ham equaliser from Maxwel Cornet was controversially disallowed by referee Andy Madley after a VAR check deemed that Chelsea goalkeeper Édouard Mendy had been fouled by Jarrod Bowen. Manager David Moyes called the decision "scandalous".

West Ham began their UEFA Europa Conference League group stage campaign on 8 September against FCSB at London Stadium. The Hammers won the game 3–1, after suffering a first-half setback from FCSB's Andrei Cordea, goals from Jarrod Bowen, Emerson and Michail Antonio sealed the win to put West Ham top of Group B after the first round of matches. The game contained multiple tributes to long-reigning British queen Elizabeth II, whose death had been announced earlier that day. Players from both teams wore black armbands and a minute's silence was held before kick-off, fans also sung a rendition of the United Kingdom's national anthem "God Save the Queen" in tribute to the late monarch.

All Premier League games for matchweek seven were postponed as part of the national period of mourning after the Queen's death, however, all European games went ahead as usual. West Ham then played Silkeborg on 15 September, conceding in the first five minutes to Kasper Kusk before Manuel Lanzini equalised from a penalty, Gianluca Scamacca put the Hammers in front and Craig Dawson gave West Ham a two-goal advantage. Silkeborg pulled one back through Søren Tengstedt but the Hammers held on for the final fifteen minutes to secure their second consecutive group stage victory.

When the Premier League returned, West Ham played Everton at Goodison Park on 18 September. The Hammers lost 1–0 due to a Neal Maupay strike shortly after half-time, leaving them in the relegation zone going into the international break. This was also their joint-worst start to a Premier League season.

October
After the international break, the Hammers played Wolverhampton Wanderers on 1 October. Gianluca Scamacca opened the scoring, with his first Premier League goal, in the first half before Jarrod Bowen doubled their lead in the second. The game finished 2–0 as the Hammers recorded their first league home win of the season. On 6 October, West Ham travelled to Belgium to face Anderlecht. The game finished 1–0 to West Ham, the only goal being scored by Gianluca Scamacca in the 79th minute.

On 9 October, the Hammers played Fulham in the Premier League. After scoring for Fulham in the 5th minute, Andreas Pereira gave away a penalty by fouling Craig Dawson in the box, Jarrod Bowen converted the penalty to equalise by sending Bernd Leno the wrong way. Lucas Paquetá assisted Gianluca Scamacca's second-half goal before Michail Antonio scored in added time to secure a 3–1 win for the Hammers. The Hammers officially sealed their place in the Conference League knockout stages on 13 October with a 2–1 win over Anderlecht, Saïd Benrahma and Jarrod Bowen scored in the first half before Sebastiano Esposito pulled one back for the Belgians via a penalty in the 89th minute.

On 16 October, West Ham drew 1–1 away to Southampton. Romain Perraud scored for the home team before Declan Rice equalised, his first league goal since October 2021. West Ham were later charged by the Football Association with failing to control their players after they surrounded referee Peter Bankes angered by his decision to allow Perruad’s goal believing that Bankes had blocked Jarrod Bowen's path as he attempted to beat Perraud. On 19 October, West Ham lost 1–0 to Liverpool. Liverpool's Darwin Núñez scored his first goal at Anfield, in the 22nd minute, whilst Jarrod Bowen had his penalty saved by Alisson just before half-time.

On 24 October, West Ham returned to the London Stadium to play Bournemouth in the Premier League. They won the game 2–0 with goals from Kurt Zouma and Saïd Benrahma, their first Premier League goals of the season. Both goals were reviewed by VAR relating to possible handball incidents. The opening goal by Kurt Zouma contained a handball by Thilo Kehrer but stood as the handball had not occurred in the immediate build-up to the goal. The second goal, a penalty, was awarded after VAR had looked at a possible handball by Bournemouth’s Jordan Zemura and decided that he had handled the ball in the penalty area.

The Hammers secured their place in the Conference League round of sixteen with a 1–0 win over Silkeborg on 27 October. The only goal of the game came from a Manuel Lanzini penalty in the first half, which was given after Silkeborg goalkeeper Nicolai Larsen fouled Michail Antonio in the box. The game was summer signing Nayef Aguerd's competitive debut, as he had just recovered from an ankle injury he sustained in a pre-season friendly against Rangers in July.

On 30 October, West Ham played Manchester United at Old Trafford. The game ended 1–0 to Manchester United, with a 38th minute goal from Marcus Rashford, his 100th for the club, sealing the win for the Red Devils. Manchester United goalkeeper David de Gea made key saves against Michail Antonio, Kurt Zouma and Declan Rice and was praised by both his own manager Erik ten Hag and West Ham manager David Moyes.

Mid-season

November
On 3 November, West Ham played FCSB in the final Conference League group stage match. The game ended in a 3–0 win for the Hammers, with Pablo Fornals scoring a brace. Debutant Divin Mubama celebrated what he believed to be his first senior goal, however, it was later deemed a Joyskim Dawa own goal. Several Academy players made their senior competitive debuts in the match, including Mubama, Oliver Scarles, Kamarai Simon-Swyer and Kaelan Casey.

On 6 November, the Hammers played Crystal Palace in the Premier League. They lost the game 2–1, with Saïd Benrahma putting the Hammers ahead early before Wilfried Zaha equalised for the Eagles late in the first half, Michael Olise then scored an added-time winner for Palace. Manager David Moyes said in a post-match interview that West Ham "didn’t deserve an awful lot from the game".

On 9 November, West Ham were knocked out of the League Cup in their first match against Blackburn Rovers. Blackburn opened the scoring in the 6th minute through Jack Vale before Pablo Fornals equalised for West Ham in the 38th minute. In the second half, Michail Antonio put West Ham ahead before Ben Brereton Díaz made the match level again. After 90 minutes, the game ended in a 2–2 draw and the match went to a penalty shoot-out. In the shoot-out, West Ham and Blackburn both scored their first nine penalties and Jake Garrett then converted Blackburn's tenth, however, West Ham's Angelo Ogbonna hit the bar and Blackburn progressed to the fourth round.

On 12 November, in their last match before the winter break, West Ham lost 2–0 to Leicester City. The Hammers conceded early in the first half as James Maddison put Leicester ahead eight minutes in and Youri Tielemans' penalty was saved by Łukasz Fabiański just before the end of the half. Despite many attempts from Lucas Paquetá, Declan Rice, Saïd Benrahma and Gianluca Scamacca, the game remained 1–0 until Harvey Barnes made it two for Leicester late on. Leicester goalkeeper Danny Ward was voted man of the match by users on the Premier League website for his performance.

Following the defeat to Leicester, their third defeat in a week leaving the club in 16th position in the league, one point above the relegation zone, a senior spokesman for the club said that Moyes "deserved the right to turn the situation around". There was then a mid-season winter break for the 2022 FIFA World Cup. Five West Ham players were called up for the World Cup by their respective national teams: Declan Rice for England, Alphonse Areola for France, Thilo Kehrer for Germany, Nayef Aguerd for Morocco and Lucas Paquetá for Brazil. Outside of the World Cup, Saïd Benrahma (for Algeria) and Vladimír Coufal and Tomáš Souček (both for the Czech Republic) were called up for friendly matches.

December
In their first match after the winter break, West Ham played Arsenal at the Emirates Stadium on 26 December. The Hammers were awarded a penalty in the 27th minute, which Saïd Benrahma converted, after William Saliba fouled Jarrod Bowen in the box. Referee Michael Oliver originally awarded Arsenal a penalty for an Aaron Cresswell handball in the last moments of the first half, however, a VAR check determined that the ball had actually struck Cresswell's head and not his hand. The Gunners fought back in the second half and won the match 3–1, with goals from Bukayo Saka, Gabriel Martinelli and Eddie Nketiah sealing the comeback victory.

On 30 December, in their last match of 2022, West Ham lost 2–0 to Brentford at London Stadium. The Hammers started the game well, with multiple attempts being saved by David Raya. However, in the 18th minute, Brentford scored as Christian Nørgaard's shot was saved by Łukasz Fabiański and rebounded to Ivan Toney. Brentford doubled their lead before half-time through Josh Dasilva, who managed to outpace Aaron Cresswell and slide the ball past Fabiański. The game was West Ham's fifth consecutive league defeat, equalling a similar run from March and April 2017 under Slaven Bilić. A minute of applause was held before the match to honour Brazilian footballer Pelé, who had passed away the day before, players from both teams also wore black armbands in tribute.

January
In their first match of 2023, West Ham played Leeds United at Elland Road on 4 January. Leeds opened the scoring midway through the first half through Wilfried Gnonto before Lucas Paquetá converted a penalty, which had been awarded after Pascal Struijk fouled Jarrod Bowen, in the final moments of the first half. Gianluca Scamacca put the Hammers ahead early in the second half before Rodrigo scored for Leeds in the 70th minute to level the match, which ended in a 2–2 draw. The match also included tributes to West Ham co-owner and joint-chairman David Gold, who had passed away earlier that day. The tributes included a bouquet of flowers being left at his allocated seat in the director's box, a round of applause from fans of both teams and black armbands being worn by all players on the pitch.

West Ham then played Brentford at the Gtech Community Stadium in the third round of the FA Cup on 7 January. The Hammers won the match 1–0 after a late Saïd Benrahma goal, ending their six-game winless run and progressing to the fourth round, where they were drawn away to Derby County. On 14 January, West Ham played Wolverhampton Wanderers at the Molineux Stadium in the Premier League. Wolves won the match 1–0, with a goal from Daniel Podence at the start of the second half sealing the Hammers 12th loss of the Premier League season.

On 21 January, West Ham played Everton at London Stadium in the Premier League. The Hammers won the match 2–0, with Jarrod Bowen scoring both goals in the first half, ending their seven-game winless run and taking the club out of the relegation zone. In a post-match interview, Bowen said it was "really special" to have scored two goals the day after announcing he was having twins with his partner Dani Dyer. The match was also the debut of new signing Danny Ings, who came on as a substitute for Michail Antonio in the second half.

West Ham played Derby County in the fourth round of the FA Cup at Pride Park on 30 January. The Hammers won the match 2–0, with goals from Jarrod Bowen and Michail Antonio sealing the win to send West Ham through to the fifth round, where they were drawn away to Manchester United.

February
The Hammers then faced Newcastle United at St James' Park on 4 February. The match ended in a 1–1 draw, with Newcastle taking the lead within the first three minutes through Callum Wilson before Lucas Paquetá equalised for West Ham in the 32nd minute. West Ham then played Chelsea at London Stadium on 11 February. Chelsea took the lead in the 16th minute through João Félix before Emerson Palmieri scored against his former club to equalise for the Hammers in the 28th minute, both goals were the scorers' first Premier League goals. Tomáš Souček appeared to have won the match for the Hammers late on but was deemed offside. The game was West Ham's second consecutive draw in the league.

West Ham then played Tottenham Hotspur at Tottenham Hotspur Stadium on 19 February. Tottenham won the match 2–0 with two second half goals from Emerson Royal and Son Heung-min after a goalless first half. The match left the Hammers in the relegation zone. When asked about the match and West Ham's overall situation in post-match interviews, manager David Moyes expressed disappointment at the defensive errors which led up to Emerson Royal's opener, whilst midfielder Flynn Downes said, "we know what we are in for now - it’s a relegation battle". On 25 February, West Ham played Nottingham Forest in the Premier League at the London Stadium. After a goalless first-half, the Hammers won the game 4–0 with two goals from Danny Ings, his first for the club, and a goal each from Declan Rice and Michail Antonio.

End of season

March
On 1 March, West Ham played Manchester United, who had been crowned League Cup champions three days prior, at Old Trafford in the fifth round of the FA Cup. After a goalless first half, the Hammers went ahead in the 54th minute through Saïd Benrahma before Nayef Aguerd scored an own goal to level the game. Alejandro Garnacho scored in the 90th minute to put the Red Devils ahead before Fred extended their lead to 3–1 in the fifth minute of added time, knocking West Ham out of the FA Cup. West Ham then returned to the league to play Brighton & Hove Albion at the American Express Community Stadium on 4 March. The Hammers lost the match 4–0, with Brighton's goals coming via an 18th-minute Alexis Mac Allister penalty and three second-half goals from Joël Veltman, Kaoru Mitoma and Danny Welbeck. During the second half, manager David Moyes was the target of chants such as "you don't know what you're doing" and "sacked in the morning" whilst captain Declan Rice described the match as "demoralising" and apologised to supporters in a post-match interview. Moyes described the result as "one of the worst results of his tenure" as West Ham manager.

West Ham then played Cypriot team AEK Larnaca in the UEFA Europa Conference League round of 16 at the AEK Arena in Larnaca on 9 March. The Hammers won the match 2–0, with Michail Antonio scoring both goals to give West Ham a 2–goal advantage going into the reverse fixture in London. The Hammers then returned to the Premier League to play Aston Villa at the London Stadium on 12 March. The match ended in a 1–1 draw after Ollie Watkins put Villa ahead 17 minutes in and Saïd Benrahma scored a penalty, which had been awarded after Leon Bailey fouled Lucas Paquetá inside the penalty area, in the 26th minute. On 16 March, West Ham played the return leg in the Europa Conference League, at the London Stadium against AEK Larnaca. They won 4–0 with a goal from Gianluca Scamacca, two from Jarrod Bowen and a debut professional goal from Divin Mubama. Towards the end of the first half, Larnaca's Gus Ledes was sent off for a challenge on Pablo Fornals after a VAR check upgraded referee Georgi Kabakov's yellow card to a red card.

Squad

Season squad

Transfers

In

Out

Loans in

Loans out

Pre-season and friendlies
On 8 June, the Hammers confirmed their first set of pre-season friendlies. Ten days later, a trip to Switzerland to face Servette was added to the schedule. A sixth friendly match was confirmed on June 21, against UEFA Europa League finalists Rangers. A day later, the final friendly to be revealed was against Lens.

During the 2022 FIFA World Cup, West Ham travelled to Cambridge United for the testimonial of Greg Taylor, then to Italy to play Udinese and finally to Fulham for winter-break friendlies.

Competitions

Overall record

Premier League

League table

Results summary

Results by round

Matches

On 16 June, the Premier League fixtures were released.

FA Cup

As a Premier League team, West Ham entered the competition in the third round proper. In the draw made on 28 November, they were drawn away to Brentford. The Hammers won the match 1–0, with a goal from Saïd Benrahma sealing their progression to the fourth round. In the draw made on 8 January, they were drawn away to Derby County. In the fifth round, the Hammers were drawn away again, against Manchester United. The Hammers lost the match 3–1, with their only goal coming through Benrahma and Manchester United's goals coming through a Nayef Aguerd own goal, Alejandro Garnacho and Fred.

EFL Cup

As West Ham were involved in the UEFA Europa Conference League, they entered the competition in the third round. In the draw made on 24 August, they were drawn at home to Blackburn Rovers. The Hammers were knocked out by Blackburn in a 10–9 penalty shoot-out after a 2–2 draw, with West Ham's goals coming from Pablo Fornals and Michail Antonio and Blackburn's from Jack Vale and Ben Brereton Díaz. Blackburn scored 10 of their penalties with only the goalkeeper left to take a penalty. Taking West Ham’s 10th penalty, defender Angelo Ogbonna hit the bar sending Blackburn through to the next round.

UEFA Europa Conference League

The Hammers entered the competition in the play-off qualification round, and were drawn against Viborg.

Qualification

Group stage

West Ham drew FCSB, Anderlecht and Silkeborg in the group stage. The fixtures were announced on 27 August.

Knockout phase

The draw for the round of 16 was announced on 24 February, with West Ham facing AEK Larnaca.

Round of 16

Quarter-finals
The draw for the quarter-finals was announced on 17 March, with West Ham facing Belgian club KAA Gent.

Statistics

Appearances and goals
 Correct as of 16 March 2023

|-
! colspan=14 style=background:#dcdcdc; text-align:center| Goalkeepers

|-
! colspan=14 style=background:#dcdcdc; text-align:center| Defenders

|-
! colspan=14 style=background:#dcdcdc; text-align:center| Midfielders

|-
! colspan=14 style=background:#dcdcdc; text-align:center| Forwards

|-
! colspan=14 style=background:#dcdcdc; text-align:center| Players who left the club permanently or on loan during the season

|}

Goalscorers
 Correct as of 16 March 2023

Discipline
 Correct as of 16 March 2023

Clean sheets
 Correct as of 16 March 2023
The list is sorted by shirt number when total clean sheets are equal.

References

West Ham United F.C. seasons
West Ham United F.C.
West Ham United
West Ham United
West Ham United